The Agricultural Instruments Standardization Agency (Indonesian: Badan Standardisasi Instrumen Pertanian, abbreviated as BSIP) is the supporting unit of the Ministry of Agriculture which is responsible for establishment of state standards for the development of products and innovation in the field of agriculture in Indonesia.

The agency is transformation of Indonesian Agency for Agricultural Research and Development (Indonesian: Badan Penelitian dan Pengembangan Pertanian, abbreviated as Balitbangtan), after the institution dissolution by Presidential Decree No. 117/2022.

History 
The Balitbangtan formally dissolved on 21 September 2022 by Presidential Decree No. 117/2022. As replacement, BSIP formed within the Ministry of Agriculture as agricultural regulatory and standardization agency. At the time of dissolution of Balitbangtan, part of the Balitbangtan researchers transferred to the National Research and Innovation Agency (Indonesian: Badan Riset dan Inovasi Nasional, abbreviated as BRIN) and placed under Research Organization for Agriculture and Food (Indonesian: Organisasi Riset Pertanian dan Pangan, abbreviated as ORPP). Around 3000 staffs, including administrative and researchers chose to be remained in Balitbangtan. The remained part of Balitbangtan become the BSIP.

Activity 
BSIP is quite different than its predecessor Balitbangtan and subsequent replacement ORPP. While ORPP performed state research in agricultural and food research, BSIP established as regulatory and standardization agency. BSIP formed in order to safeguard national interests in agriculture. In apparent deal between the Ministry of Agriculture and BRIN, BSIP retained some functions in research and development in specialized agriculture research like in development of high-quality seeds.

Organization Structure 
According to Minister of Agriculture Decree No. 13/2023, the agency structured as follows:
 Office of the Head of Agricultural Instruments Standardization Agency
 Office of the Secretary of Agricultural Instruments Standardization Agency
 Information Center for Agricultural Instruments Standards, Bogor
 Center for Instruments Standardization of Food Crops
 Indonesian Instruments Standardization Testing Center for Rice, Subang
 Indonesian Instruments Standardization Testing Center for Legumes, Malang
 Indonesian Instruments Standardization Testing Center for Cereals, Maros
 Indonesian Instruments Standardization Testing Station for Tuber Crops, Sidenreng Rappang
 Center for Instruments Standardization of Horticulture
 Indonesian Instruments Standardization Testing Center for Vegetables, West Bandung
 Indonesian Instruments Standardization Testing Center for Tropical Fruits, Solok
 Indonesian Instruments Standardization Testing Center for Ornamental Plants, Cianjur
 Indonesian Instruments Standardization Testing Center for Citrus and Subtropical Fruits, Batu
 Center for Instruments Standardization of Plantations
 Indonesian Instruments Standardization Testing Center for Spices, Medicinal Plants, and Aromatics, Bogor
 Indonesian Instruments Standardization Testing Center for Industrial Crops and Freshener Crops, Sukabumi
 Indonesian Instruments Standardization Testing Center for Sweeteners and Fiber Crops, Malang
 Indonesian Instruments Standardization Testing Center for Palms, North Minahasa
 Center for Instruments Standardization of Animal Farms and Animal Health
 Indonesian Instruments Standardization Testing Center for Veterinary, Bogor
 Indonesian Instruments Standardization Testing Center for Fowls and Cattles, Bogor
 Indonesian Instruments Standardization Testing Station for Large Ruminants, Pasuruan
 Indonesian Instruments Standardization Testing Station for Small Ruminants, Deli Serdang
 Indonesian Center for Agricultural Instruments Standards Application, Bogor
 Aceh Agricultural Instruments Standards Application Institute, Banda Aceh
 North Sumatera Agricultural Instruments Standards Application Institute, Medan
 West Sumatera Agricultural Instruments Standards Application Institute, Solok
 Riau Agricultural Instruments Standards Application Institute, Pekanbaru
 Jambi Agricultural Instruments Standards Application Institute, Kotabaru
 South Sumatera Agricultural Instruments Standards Application Institute, Palembang
 Bengkulu Agricultural Instruments Standards Application Institute, Bengkulu
 Lampung Agricultural Instruments Standards Application Institute, Bandar Lampung
 Bangka Belitung Islands Agricultural Instruments Standards Application Institute, Pangkal Pinang
 Riau Island Agricultural Instruments Standards Application Institute, Tanjung Pinang
 Jakarta Agricultural Instruments Standards Application Institute, South Jakarta
 West Java Agricultural Instruments Standards Application Institute, Lembang
 Central Java Agricultural Instruments Standards Application Institute, Ungaran
 Yogyakarta Agricultural Instruments Standards Application Institute, Yogyakarta
 East Java Agricultural Instruments Standards Application Institute, Malang
 Banten Agricultural Instruments Standards Application Institute, Serang
 Bali Agricultural Instruments Standards Application Institute, Denpasar
 West Nusa Tenggara Agricultural Instruments Standards Application Institute, Mataram
 East Nusa Tenggara Agricultural Instruments Standards Application Institute, Kupang
 West Kalimantan Agricultural Instruments Standards Application Institute, Pontianak
 Central Kalimantan Agricultural Instruments Standards Application Institute, Palangkaraya
 South Kalimantan Agricultural Instruments Standards Application Institute, Banjarbaru
 East Kalimantan Agricultural Instruments Standards Application Institute, Samarinda
 North Sulawesi Agricultural Instruments Standards Application Institute, Manado
 Central Sulawesi Agricultural Instruments Standards Application Institute, Palu
 South Sulawesi Agricultural Instruments Standards Application Institute, Makassar
 South East Sulawesi Agricultural Instruments Standards Application Institute, Kendari
 Gorontalo Agricultural Instruments Standards Application Institute, Gorontalo
 West Sulawesi Agricultural Instruments Standards Application Institute, Mamuju
 Maluku Agricultural Instruments Standards Application Institute, Ambon
 North Maluku Agricultural Instruments Standards Application Institute, Ternate Selatan
 West Papua Agricultural Instruments Standards Application Institute, Manokwari
 Papua Agricultural Instruments Standards Application Institute, Jayapura
 Indonesian Testing Center for Agricultural Instruments Standardization in Agricultural Land Resources, Bogor
 Indonesian Instruments Standardization Testing Center for Land and Fertilizers, Bogor
 Indonesian Instruments Standardization Testing Center for Agricultural Environment, Pati
 Indonesian Instruments Standardization Testing Center for Wetland Agriculture, Banjarbaru
 Indonesian Instruments Standardization Testing Station for Agroclimatic and Hydrology, Bogor
 Indonesian Testing Center for Agricultural Mechanics Instruments and Standards, Tangerang
 Indonesian Testing Center for Post-Harvest Instruments and Standards, Tangerang
 Indonesian Testing Center for Agricultural Biotechnology and Genetic Resources Instruments Standards Application, Bogor

References 

Science and technology in Indonesia
Government agencies of Indonesia
2022 establishments in Indonesia